Zavis Peak is a sharp peak, standing 4 miles (6 km) west of Navigator Peak at the south end of Founders Escarpment in the Heritage Range. It was named by the University of Minnesota Geological Party of 1963–64 for Alfred Zavis, a United States Geological Survey (USGS) topographic engineer with the party in these mountains.

References

Mountains of Ellsworth Land